The Shelon is a river in the northwest part of European Russia, in Dedovichsky, Porkhovsky, and Dnovsky Districts of Pskov Oblast and Soletsky and Shimsky Districts of Novgorod Oblast. The Shelon is one of the principal tributaries of Lake Ilmen. The towns of Porkhov and Soltsy, as well as urban-type settlements of Dedovichi and Shimsk, are located on the banks of the Shelon. The principal tributaries of the Shelon are the Sudoma (left), the Belka (right), the Polonka (right), the Uza (left), the Udokha (left), the Sitnya (left), and the Mshaga (left).

The Shelon has its source in the swamps at the east of Pskov Oblast, close to the border with Novgorod Oblast. It flows northeast, then turns around and flows west. Around the urban-type settlement of Dedovichi the Shelon turns northwest. It further enters Porkhovsky District, and behind Porkhov turns north and then northeast. The Shelon crosses a short segment of Dnovsky District and returns to Porkhovsky District, crossing then to Novgorod Oblast. In Novgorod Oblast, the Shelon flows northeast and has its mouth by the urban-type settlement of Shimsk, forming an estuary.

The river basin of the Shelon comprises vast areas on the Ilmen Depression which administratively are located in Soletsky, Shimsky, and Volotovsky Districts of Novgorod Oblast, and in Porkhovsky, Dnovsky, Dedovichsky, and Bezhanitsky Districts of Pskov Oblast.

The Shelon is navigable downstream of the town of Soltsy, however, there is no passenger navigation.

History 
The Battle of Shelon (July 14, 1471) between Muscovy and Novgorod Republic occurred in between the town of Soltsy and the mouth of Shelon. It ended up with a victory of the Muscovite army led by Prince Kholmsky, and consequently resulted in the annexation of Novgorod by Muscovy (1478).

References

External links

 

Rivers of Novgorod Oblast
Rivers of Pskov Oblast